Ilex sintenisii (Sintenis' holly or cuero de sapo) is a species of plant in the family Aquifoliaceae. It is endemic to Puerto Rico.  It is threatened by habitat loss. It is a federally listed endangered species of the United States.

There are only 150 individuals remaining in the Luquillo Mountains of Puerto Rico.

References

sintenisii
Endemic flora of Puerto Rico
Endangered plants
Taxonomy articles created by Polbot